Classic rock is a radio format which plays popular rock music particularly from the late 1960s onward.

Classic Rock may also refer to:

 Classic Rock (Time-Life Music)
 Classic Rock series, album series by the London Symphony Orchestra and the Royal Choral Society
 Classic Rock (album), by the London Symphony Orchestra
 Classic Rock (magazine), a British magazine
 Classic Rock (Australian radio network)
 Classic Rock (Dial Global radio network), a U.S.-based radio music format
 Classic Rock (Westwood One), a U.S.-based radio music format
 Arena Rock, the musical genre commonly referred to as classic rock

See also
 Classical rock, progressive rock